Women's water polo became an Olympic sport at the 2000 Olympics. Since then, the United States women's team has won six consecutive medals.

There are thirty-five female athletes who have won two or more Olympic medals in water polo. Heather Petri and Brenda Villa of the United States are the only two female athletes to win four Olympic medals in water polo.

Abbreviations

Medalists by tournament

Overall multiple medalists
As of the 2020 Summer Olympics, 35 female athletes have won three or more Olympic medals in water polo.

By tournament
The following table is pre-sorted by edition of the Olympics (in ascending order), name of the team (in ascending order), name of the player (in ascending order), respectively. Last updated: 10 August 2021.

Legend
 Team* – Host team

Sources:
 Official Results Books (PDF): 2000 (p. 28), 2004 (p. 2), 2008 (p. 2), 2012 (p. 285), 2016 (p. 135), 2020 (p. 156).

By confederation
Last updated: 11 August 2021.

By team
Last updated: 11 August 2021.

By position
Last updated: 11 August 2021.

Four or more Olympic medals

Three Olympic medals
The following table is pre-sorted by number of Olympic gold medals (in descending order), number of Olympic silver medals (in descending order), year of receiving the last Olympic medal (in ascending order), year of receiving the first Olympic medal (in ascending order), name of the player (in ascending order), respectively. Last updated: 10 August 2021.

Three female athletes won three Olympic medals in water polo.

Legend
  – Hosts

Source:
 Official Results Books (PDF): 2000 (p. 28), 2004 (p. 2), 2008 (p. 2), 2012 (p. 285), 2016 (p. 135), 2020 (p. 156).

Two Olympic medals
The following table is pre-sorted by number of Olympic gold medals (in descending order), number of Olympic silver medals (in descending order), year of receiving the last Olympic medal (in ascending order), year of receiving the first Olympic medal (in ascending order), name of the player (in ascending order), respectively. Last updated: 11 August 2021.

Thirty female athletes won two Olympic medals in water polo.

Legend
  – Hosts

Source:
 Official Results Books (PDF): 2000 (p. 28), 2004 (p. 2), 2008 (p. 2), 2012 (p. 285), 2016 (p. 135), 2020 (p. 156).

Multiple medalists by team
The following tables are pre-sorted by total number of Olympic medals (in descending order), number of Olympic gold medals (in descending order), number of Olympic silver medals (in descending order), year of receiving the last Olympic medal (in ascending order), year of receiving the first Olympic medal (in ascending order), name of the player (in ascending order), respectively.

Legend
 Year* – As host team

Australia
 Women's national team: 
 Team appearances: 6 (2000*–2020)
 As host team: 2000*
* Number of three-time Olympic medalists: 0
 Number of two-time Olympic medalists: 5
 Last updated: 11 August 2021.

Legend
  – Hosts

Greece
 Women's national team: 
 Team appearances: 2 (2004*–2008)
 As host team: 2004*
* Number of three-time Olympic medalists: 0
 Number of two-time Olympic medalists: 0
 Last updated: 1 May 2021.

Hungary
 Women's national team: 
 Team appearances: 5 (2004–2020)
 As host team: —
* Number of three-time Olympic medalists: 0
 Number of two-time Olympic medalists: 0
 Last updated: 7 August 2021.

Italy
 Women's national team: 
 Team appearances: 4 (2004–2016)
 As host team: —
* Number of three-time Olympic medalists: 0
 Number of two-time Olympic medalists: 1
 Last updated: 1 May 2021.

Netherlands
 Women's national team: 
 Team appearances: 3 (2000, 2008, 2020)
 As host team: —
* Number of three-time Olympic medalists: 0
 Number of two-time Olympic medalists: 0
 Last updated: 1 May 2021.

Russia
 Women's national team: 
 Team appearances: 6 (2000–2020)
 As host team: —
* Number of three-time Olympic medalists: 0
 Number of two-time Olympic medalists: 0
 Last updated: 1 May 2021.

Spain
 Women's national team: 
 Team appearances: 3 (2012–2020)
 As host team: —
* Number of three-time Olympic medalists: 0
 Number of two-time Olympic medalists: 6
 Last updated: 10 August 2021.

Legend
  – Hosts

United States
 Women's national team: 
 Team appearances: 6 (2000–2020)
 As host team: —
* Number of four-time Olympic medalists: 2
 Number of three-time Olympic medalists: 3
 Number of two-time Olympic medalists: 18
 Last updated: 10 August 2021.

Legend
  – Hosts

See also
 Water polo at the Summer Olympics

 Lists of Olympic water polo records and statistics
 List of men's Olympic water polo tournament records and statistics
 List of women's Olympic water polo tournament records and statistics
 List of Olympic champions in men's water polo
 List of Olympic champions in women's water polo
 National team appearances in the men's Olympic water polo tournament
 National team appearances in the women's Olympic water polo tournament
 List of players who have appeared in multiple men's Olympic water polo tournaments
 List of players who have appeared in multiple women's Olympic water polo tournaments
 List of Olympic medalists in water polo (men)
 List of men's Olympic water polo tournament top goalscorers
 List of women's Olympic water polo tournament top goalscorers
 List of men's Olympic water polo tournament goalkeepers
 List of women's Olympic water polo tournament goalkeepers
 List of Olympic venues in water polo

 List of World Aquatics Championships medalists in water polo

References

Sources

External links
 Olympic water polo – Official website

 Women
Medalists, Women
Olympics, Women
Water polo, Women
Water polo